Hamza Gül (born 27 July 1987), better known by his stage name Allâme, is a Turkish rapper and songwriter.

Discography

Albums

EPs

Instrumental albums

Compilation and split albums

Singles

References 

Living people
1987 births
Turkish rappers
Turkish hip hop
Turkish lyricists
Turkish male singers
People from Trabzon